Anoncia is a genus of moths in the family Cosmopterigidae.

Species
Anoncia aciculata (Meyrick, 1928)
Anoncia alboligula Hodges, 1962
Anoncia bitoqua Hodges, 1978
Anoncia brunneipes Hodges, 1962
Anoncia callida Hodges, 1962
Anoncia chordostoma (Meyrick, 1912)
Anoncia conia (Walsingham, 1907) (syn: Borkhausenia marinensis Keifer, 1935)
Anoncia crossi Adamski, 1989
Anoncia diveni (Heinrich, 1921)
Anoncia episcia (Walsingham, 1907)
Anoncia fasciata (Walsingham, 1907)
Anoncia flegax Hodges, 1978
Anoncia fregeis Hodges, 1978
Anoncia furvicosta Hodges, 1962
Anoncia glacialis Hodges, 1962
Anoncia leucoritis (Meyrick, 1927) (syn: Anoncia mentzeliae Clarke, 1942)
Anoncia loexya Hodges, 1978
Anoncia longa (Meyrick, 1927)
Anoncia mones Hodges, 1978
Anoncia mosa Hodges, 1978
Anoncia naclia Hodges, 1978
Anoncia nebritis Hodges, 1962
Anoncia nocticola Hodges, 1962
Anoncia noscres Hodges, 1978
Anoncia orites (Walsingham, 1907)
Anoncia piperata Hodges, 1962
Anoncia porriginosa Hodges, 1962
Anoncia psentia Hodges, 1978
Anoncia psepsa Hoges, 1978
Anoncia slales Hodges, 1978
Anoncia smogops Hodges, 1978
Anoncia sphacelina (Keifer, 1935)
Anoncia texanella (Chambers, 1878)
Anoncia venis Hodges, 1978

References
Natural History Museum Lepidoptera genus database

Cosmopteriginae
Moth genera